Gisle Oddvar Fenne (born 9 June 1963) is a former Norwegian biathlete. His best-known international achievement was the silver medal in the 20 km individual in the World Championships 1989 in Feistritz an der Drau. He succeeded in many duels with teammate Eirik Kvalfoss. He was among the top Norwegian biathletes from the mid-1980s until the mid-1990s, and became twice the Norwegian champion in the 20 km individual. He is the father of biathlete Hilde Fenne.

Biathlon results
All results are sourced from the International Biathlon Union.

Olympic Games

World Championships
4 medals (2 silver, 2 bronze)

*During Olympic seasons competitions are only held for those events not included in the Olympic program.
**Team was added as an event in 1989.

Individual victories
1 victory (1 In)

*Results are from UIPMB and IBU races which include the Biathlon World Cup, Biathlon World Championships and the Winter Olympic Games.

References

External links
 

1963 births
Living people
People from Voss
Norwegian male biathletes
Biathletes at the 1988 Winter Olympics
Biathletes at the 1992 Winter Olympics
Olympic biathletes of Norway
Biathlon World Championships medalists
Holmenkollen Ski Festival winners
Sportspeople from Vestland